Kasaragod Khader Bhai is a 1992 Indian Malayalam-language comedy film directed by Thulasidas and starring Jagadish, Siddique, Ashokan, Zainuddin, Innocent, Mala Aravindan, Alummoodan, Babu Antony, Sunitha, Suchitra and Philomina. The film is a sequel to 1991 film Mimics Parade. In 2010, it spawned a sequel titled Again Kasargod Khader Bhai.

Plot
The film is about how Kasargod Khader Bhai (Alummoodan) and his son Kasim Bhai (Babu Antony), a criminal who attempts to murder people in his reach tries to take revenge on the mimicry artists who send Khader Bhai to jail.

Cast
 Jagadish as Unni
 Siddique as Sabu
 Ashokan as Jimmy
 Zainuddin as Nizam
 Baiju as Manoj
 Ansar Kalabhavan as Anwar
 Innocent as Fr. Francis Tharakkandam
 Mala Aravindan as Mammootty
 Sunitha as Sandhya Cheriyan
 Suchitra as Latha
 Sai Kumar as Sreenivasa Menon
 Mahesh as Jayan
 K. B. Ganesh Kumar
 Kalabhavan Abi
 Idavela Babu
 Nadirshah
 Shankaradi as Pachalam Pappachan
 Philomina as Thandamma
 Alummoodan as Kasargod Khader Bhai
 Babu Antony as Kasim Bhai (Voice Dubbing by Prof. Aliyar)
 Mohanraj as Khader Bhai's right hand
 Sivaji as Frederik Cherian, Sandhya's brother
 Sadiq as Stephen Cherian, Sandhya's brother
 Prathapachandran as Cherian, Sandhya's father
 Kanakalatha as Latha's mother
 Praseetha Menon as Female mimicry artist
 Kalabhavan Haneef as mimicry artist
 Subair as Police Officer

Soundtrack
Music: Johnson, Lyrics: Bichu Thirumala.

 Neelakkurkkan - Jolly Abraham, Krishnachandran, Sujatha Mohan, Johnson, C. O. Anto, Natesh Shankar

External links
 
 Kasargod Khader Bhai at the Malayalam Movie Database
 Kasargod Khader Bhai at Cinemaofmalayalam.net

1990s Malayalam-language films
1992 comedy films
1992 films
Indian sequel films
FMimicKader2
Films directed by Thulasidas